The Pentecostal Conference of North American Keralites (PCNAK) is an annual conference of Pentecostals of Keralite origin or from Kerala, India. The conference takes place annually in various cities of North America for the purpose of "mutual edification, fellowship and renewing friendships" PCNAK is reportedly the largest annual South Asian Christian conference in North America today with over 5,000 people in attendance.

History
The first conference was held in 1983 at Oklahoma.
List of the year and host city, state/province of PCNAK:
 1983	Oklahoma City, Oklahoma
 1984	Cape May, New Jersey / Dallas, Texas
 1985	Cleveland, Tennessee
 1986	Houston, Texas
 1987	Wayne, New Jersey
 1988	Chicago, Illinois
 1989	Dallas, Texas
 1990	Orlando, Florida
 1991	Cleveland, Tennessee
 1992	Toronto, Ontario
 1993	Syracuse, New York
 1994	Chicago, Illinois
 1995	Arlington, Texas
 1996	Knoxville, Tennessee
 1997	Lansing, Michigan
 1998	Houston, Texas
 1999	Somerset, New Jersey
 2000	Oklahoma City, Oklahoma
 2001	Long Beach, California
 2002	Atlanta, Georgia
 2003	Valley Forge, Pennsylvania
 2004	Virginia Beach, Virginia
 2005	Rochester, New York
 2006	Arlington, Texas
 2007	Orlando, Florida
 2008	Atlanta, Georgia
 2009	Chicago, Illinois
 2010	Houston, Texas
 2011	Oklahoma City, Oklahoma
 2012	Hamilton, Ontario
 2013	Hartford, Connecticut
 2014	Lansing, Michigan
 2015  Greenville, South Carolina
 2016  Addison, Texas 
 2017  Columbus, Ohio 
 2018  Springfield, Massachusetts 
 2019  Miami,  Florida
 2020  Lancaster, Pennsylvania (Postponed to 2023)
 2021 Houston, Texas (Postponed to 2024)
 2022 Honolulu, Hawaii

PCNAK Youth
PCNAK Youth is the English stream of PCNAK and generally people age under 40 participates.  The focus is on the spiritual well being of the young people as well as opportunity is created for sports and other activities.  The Sports Day Tournaments include Men's Basketball, U-19 Basketball, Men's/Women's Volleyball, and other sports based on priority expressed interest of the community. more detailed information available in the history of the pentecostal movement. author Joy Thumpamon

References

External links
 PCNAK.NET
 PCNAK.INFO
 PCNAKYOUTH.NET

Evangelical Christian conferences
Christian organizations established in 1983
Pentecostal denominations established in the 20th century
Pentecostalism in India